The following elections were scheduled for 2022 in the U.S. state of Delaware.

 2022 Delaware Senate election
 2022 Delaware Attorney General election
 2022 Delaware House of Representatives election
 2022 Delaware State Treasurer election
 2022 United States House of Representatives election in Delaware

See also 

 2022 United States elections

Delaware